Norman Prescott-Davies (1862–1915) was an English painter and illustrator.

Davies was born in Isleworth, and studied at the London International College and South Kensington. He was elected Associate of the Royal College of Art in 1891, and to the Royal Society of British Artists in 1893.

Notes

1862 births
1915 deaths
English painters
English watercolourists
English illustrators